Humaid Al-Najjar (Arabic:حميد النجار) (born 22 February 1989) is an Emirati footballer. He currently plays as a goalkeeper for Dibba Al Fujairah.

External links

References

Emirati footballers
1989 births
Living people
Al-Nasr SC (Dubai) players
Dibba FC players
Al-Wasl F.C. players
UAE First Division League players
UAE Pro League players
Association football goalkeepers